William Edward Ayrton, FRS (14 September 18478 November 1908) was an English physicist and electrical engineer.

Life

Early life and education
Ayrton was born in London, the son of Edward Nugent Ayrton, a barrister, and educated at University College School and University College, London. He later studied under Lord Kelvin at Glasgow.

India (1868–1872)
In 1868, Ayrton went to Bengal in the service of the Indian Government Telegraph department, where he invented a method of detecting faults in lines, which was of great benefit in the maintenance of the overland communications network.Returning to England, Ayrton married Matilda Chaplin.

Japan (1873–1879)
In 1873, Ayrton accepted an invitation from the Japanese government as Chair of Natural Philosophy and Telegraphy at the new Imperial College of Engineering, Tokyo. He advised the college's architect on the design of the laboratory and demonstration rooms, and is credited with introducing the electric arc light to Japan in 1878.

Sierra Leone (1880)
Ayrton worked for several months in Freetown, Sierra Leone before returning to London. He worked in an advisory role with respects to engineering in the colony.

London
On his return to London, Ayrton became professor of applied physics at the Finsbury College of the City and Guilds of London Technical Institute, and, in 1884, he was chosen professor of electrical engineering, or of applied physics, at the Central Technical College, South Kensington.  He published, both alone and jointly with others, a large number of papers on physical, and in particular electrical, subjects, and his name was especially associated, together with that of Professor John Perry, with the invention of a long series of electrical measuring instruments, including the spiral-spring ammeter, and the wattmeter.  They also worked on railway electrification, produced a dynamometer and the first electric tricycle.  Ayrton is also known for his work on the electric searchlight.

Ayrton died in London in 1908 and is buried in Brompton Cemetery.

Family
In 1872, Ayrton married his cousin, Matilda Chaplin (1846–1883), one of the Edinburgh Seven, the first group of matriculated undergraduate female students at any British university who fought for open medical education for women. The marriage took place while Ayrton was on home leave from India and Matilda was involved in the Edinburgh Seven campaign. Chaplin was awarded a posthumous honorary MBChB by the University of Edinburgh in 2019.

Chaplin and Ayrton's daughter was the feminist and author Edith Ayrton, wife of Israel Zangwill and mother of Oliver Zangwill.

Ayrton married his second wife, Phoebe Sarah Marks, in 1885. She assisted him in his research and became known (as Hertha Ayrton) for her own scientific work on the electric arc and other subjects. In 1899, Ayrton supported Hertha on her way to being elected the first woman member of the Institution of Electrical Engineers and the Royal Society awarded her a Hughes Medal in 1906. Their daughter Barbara Ayrton-Gould became a Labour MP; grandson Michael Ayrton was an artist and sculptor.

Hertha and William Ayrton acted as guardians for artist and suffragette Ernestine Mills after the death of Mills' mother Emily "Mynie" Ernest Bell in 1893. (Her father, writer Thomas Evans Bell had died in 1887).

Honours and awards
He was elected president in 1892 of the Institute of Electrical Engineers. 
He was elected a Fellow of the Royal Society in 1881 and awarded their Royal Medal in 1901.

See also
Henry Dyer
John Milne
Anglo-Japanese relations
 Ayrton shunt

Notes

References
 Graham Gooday's entry in the New Dictionary of National Biography published in September 2004.

1847 births
1908 deaths
Scientists from London
Alumni of University College London
English expatriates in Japan
English physicists
Foreign advisors to the government in Meiji-period Japan
Foreign educators in Japan
Burials at Brompton Cemetery
English inventors
Fellows of the Royal Society
People educated at University College School
Royal Medal winners
Alumni of the University of Glasgow
Presidents of the Physical Society
English electrical engineers
19th-century British physicists
20th-century British physicists
19th-century British engineers
20th-century British engineers
19th-century English scientists
20th-century English scientists
William